The Women's 15 kilometre pursuit event of the FIS Nordic World Ski Championships 2017 was held on 25 February 2017.

Results
The race was started at 12:00.

References

Women's 15 kilometre pursuit
2017 in Finnish women's sport